The Jingili or Jingulu are an indigenous Australian people of the Northern Territory.

Language
Jingulu is classified as belonging to the Mirndi family of non Pama-Nyungan languages. An early word-list was compiled by F. A. Gillen. Following in the wake of pioneering work by Neil Chadwick in the 1970s, Robert Pensalfini wrote out a grammar of Jingulu on the basis of fieldwork with its last known fluent speakers.

Country
The southern frontier was around the Renner Springs area about Mount Grayling, extending northwards to Newcastle Waters and also took in the area of the Ashburton Range. To the east they encompassed Cattle Creek south of Wave Hill and Ucharonidge. Their western extension ran as far as the 25 miles from Lake Woods.

Social organization
R. H. Mathews constructed an early scheme to set forth the marriage divisions of the Jingili.

Some eight years later he reconfigured the data in the following terms:-

History of contact
According to oral tradition, the Jingili originally migrated from the Great Western Desert.

Alternative names
 Chingalee, Chingalli
 Djingili, Djingali, Djinggili
 Leechunguloo
 T(h)ingalie
 Tjingale, Tchingalee
 Tjingilli, Tjingali, Tjingalli
 Tjingilu

Source:

Some words
 mowija. (pieces of crystallized quartz used, according to Ravenscroft, to kill an enemy by creeping up to him when the latter slept, and placing the stones on his chest.)

Notes

Citations

Sources

Aboriginal peoples of the Northern Territory